Cardinal Local School District is a public school district in Geauga County, Ohio, that serves the village of Middlefield and the townships of Middlefield, Huntsburg and Parkman. , 1467 students attended the district's five schools.

The district is in the center of the world's fourth largest Amish settlement (Ohio's second largest). Amish students may stop attending school after the eighth grade to work on their family farms, and many only attend public school for a short time to become proficient in English. As a result, Cardinal High School does not have any Amish students.

On January 25, 2023, the school board attracted national media attention for their decision to ban a student production of The 25th Annual Putnam County Spelling Bee on the grounds that it was "vulgar." The school board denied the decision was related to the presence of two gay characters in the play.

Schools
Cardinal High School, grades 9-12.
Cardinal Middle School, grades 5–8. (is also the newest school built in 2002-2003
A.J. Jordak Elementary, grades K–4

Former schools
Cardinal Intermediate (grades 3-4)
Huntsburg Elementary (grades PK-5)
Parkman Elementary (grades PK-5)

See also
List of school districts in Ohio

References

External links
Cardinal Local School District official site

Cardinal Local School District
School districts in Ohio